Maharshi Valmiki College of Education (MVCE) is one of the constituent colleges of the University of Delhi, situated at Geeta Colony, New Delhi.

Programmes
The college offers Bachelor of Education (B.Ed.) undergraduate courses under the aegis of its affiliate, University of Delhi.

References

External links
 

Universities and colleges in Delhi
Delhi University
1996 establishments in Delhi
Educational institutions established in 1996